Broadcast Film Critics Association Awards 2002 may refer to:

 7th Critics' Choice Awards, the seventh Critics' Choice Awards ceremony that took place in 2002
 8th Critics' Choice Awards, the eighth Critics' Choice Awards ceremony that took place in 2003 and which honored the best in film for 2002